Walter Satterlee (January 18, 1844May 28, 1908) was an American figure and genre painter.

Biography
He was born in Brooklyn, New York. He graduated from Columbia University in 1863, studied in the National Academy of Design, and with Edwin White, in New York, and in 1878–1879 under Leon Bonnat in Paris. He first exhibited at the National Academy in 1868, was elected an associate of the Academy in 1879, and received its Thomas B. Clarke prize in 1886. He was a member of the American Water Color Society and of the New York Etching Club, and was an excellent teacher. Satterlee died in Brooklyn in 1908.

Among his favorite subjects were Arab life and figures in the costume of the colonial period.

References

Further reading
Simonson, George Montfort. "A Man of Talent". Peterson Magazine, vol. 5, no. 11 (November 1895), pp. 1123–32.

External links

 

1844 births
1908 deaths
19th-century American painters
19th-century American male artists
American male painters
20th-century American painters
American genre painters
Artists from Brooklyn
Painters from New York City
Columbia College (New York) alumni
National Academy of Design alumni
National Academy of Design associates
20th-century American male artists